The 1929-30 season in Swedish football, starting August 1929 and ending July 1930:

Honours

Official titles

Competitions

Promotions, relegations and qualifications

Promotions

Relegations

Domestic results

Allsvenskan 1929–30

Division 2 Norra 1929–30

Division 2 Södra 1929–30

Division 2 promotion play-off 1929–30

National team results

 Sweden: 

 Sweden: 

 Sweden: 

 Sweden: 

 Sweden: 

 Sweden:

National team players in season 1929/30

Notes

References
Print

Online

 
Seasons in Swedish football